Ilpo Kalervo Seppälä (born 26 October 1953, in Viitasaari) is a Finnish former wrestler who competed in the 1984 Summer Olympics.

References

External links
 

1953 births
Living people
Olympic wrestlers of Finland
Wrestlers at the 1984 Summer Olympics
Finnish male sport wrestlers
People from Viitasaari
Sportspeople from Central Finland
World Wrestling Championships medalists